Crkvina is an uninhabited islet in Croatia, part of the Elaphiti Islands archipelago off the coast of southern Dalmatia, near Dubrovnik.

References

Islets of Croatia
Islands of the Adriatic Sea
Uninhabited islands of Croatia
Elaphiti Islands